Contextual application design in digital media is the adaptation of the contextual design process developed by Hugh Beyer and Karen Holtzblatt, in the mobile software space, taking advantage of the measurability of the media, context awareness technologies in mobile devices, aggregation and analytics systems, to create a user-centered design process where developers aggregate data from users' real-world behavior and patterns, and applying these findings into a final product.

Uses and adaptations 

Contextual application design has primarily been used to create mobile applications that may deliver valuable insights based on cross referencing digital content with physical context, such as the experience delivered by Google Now. Another implementation is to create applications with a user interface that is reactive to context using context-sensitive user interface. These methods have also been implemented for software, and parts of contextual design have been adapted for use as a usability evaluation method.

Process overview 

The contextual design process consists of the following: contextual inquiry, data consolidation and analytics, visioning, storyboarding, user environment design, and prototyping.

Collecting data – contextual inquiry 

Contextual inquiry is a field data collection technique used to capture detailed information about how users of a product interact with the product in their normal environment. In mobile applications, a key aspect of the technique is detailed logging of their physical environment factors (factors), typically achieved by logging mobile sensor data or data from a contextual awareness SDK, combined with their in-app activity and interaction. Key takeaways from the technique are to learn what users actually do, why they do it that way and when.

Data analytics 

The purpose of the data analysis is to reveal patterns and the structure across distinct interactions. A contextual data analytics collects data logs, events and context awareness parameters and streams them into an easy to process database which may be queried to provide insights. A typical example would be the system implemented by Sensiya Analytics.

Visioning 

In visioning, a cross-functional team comes together to vision and suggest better performing experiences based on reviewing the data and identifying key issues and opportunities. Visions are a variety of new product concepts for different usage scenarios based on the data collected.

Storyboarding 

After visioning, a design team develops the vision in storyboards, capturing scenarios of how users will work with the new system under different context.

Software prototyping 

Software prototyping is used for testing the design ideas with interactive prototypes before the implementation phase helps the designers communicate with users about the new system and develop the design further.

References 

Mobile software
Software design